Bleeding edge is a term used to describe the very latest and most modern technology available, such as the latest version of a rolling-release software.

Bleeding edge may also refer to:

 Bleeding Edge (novel), a novel by Thomas Pynchon
 The Bleeding Edge, a 2018 documentary about medical device industry
 Bleeding Edge (video game), an online combat game by Ninja Theory
 Bleeding Edge Armor, fictional armor worn by comic book superhero Iron Man